Tripurantaka or Tripurari and Pashupati is a manifestation of the Hindu god Shiva. In this aspect, Shiva is depicted  with four arms wielding a bow and arrow, but different from the Pinakapani murti. He holds an axe and a deer on the upper pair of his arms. In the lower pair of the arms, he holds a bow and an arrow respectively. After destroying Tripura, Tripurantaka Shiva smeared his forehead with three strokes of Ashes. This has become a prominent symbol of Shiva and is practiced even today by Shaivites.

Legend
Shiva as Tripurantaka is accredited with destroying three mythical cities of the asuras. Out of eight legends narrating Shiva's role as the destroyer of evil, the Tripura-samhara (Destruction of the three citadels) legend relates to the destruction of the three evil cities Tripura by Shiva.

The demon Taraka had three off-springs named Taarakaaksha, Kamalaaksha and Vidyunmaali. These demon princes performed severe penance towards the creator-god Brahma and obtained the boon of immense power. Brahma, on being pleased with them, presented each of them with an aerial city revolving in the sky.  The legend further states that these three cities or forts (Tripura) continued to revolve in the sky for hundreds of years. In the course of revolving, the three would converge very rarely. The boon granted them that they would live for a thousand years in the three invincible, moving cities  and that they would be destroyed only by an arrow that could merge the three forts into one, and set them to fire. The demons, armed with this boon, wreaked havoc on the universe. The asuras well-entrenched in their aerial cities would mount attacks on the devas (gods) and the rishis (sages), and harass them. Ultimately, the gods and the sages approached Shiva and pleaded for his assistance in removing this menace. Lord Shiva agreed to help them and waited for an opportune moment. 

At the end of the stipulated time period, Shiva created a bow and an arrow and a chariot with the various gods and goddesses and components of the universe. The moment the three aerial cities converged, Shiva mounted on his chariot and moved upwards. He took out his bow and arrow, and hit the converged cities with a single arrow. With Brahma as the charioteer, he sped across, and shot a single arrow of fire, which was created of none other than  Vishnu. The cosmic arrow destroyed the three cities.

The components of the Tripurantaka charge are as follow:
Chariot: Pritvi (The Earth)
Charioteer: Brahma
Chariot Wheels: Sun and Moon
Bow: Mount Meru
Bow String: Serpent Vasuki
Arrow: Vishnu

One version of the myth maintains that, finally when everything was ready for the Tripura invasion, the devas were proud that only with their help Shiva is going to destroy the Tripuras. But to the astonishment of all, Lord Shiva, didn't use any of the war machinery arranged by the Devas. Lord Shiva, instead smiled and in that smile the three purams were burned immediately. In fact, the Rudraksha appeared from the three eyes of Shiva during tripurasamhAra. The pride and thought of devas that without their help the God would not have been able to destroy the tripuras was proved wrong. Shocked at this act, Brahma pleaded that Devas thought wrong and that Shiva should forgive and release the arrow, or else the Devas would have a permanent bad name and the reason behind making this chariot would become meaningless. Shiva then fired the arrow on the already burning Cities. 

When Lord Shiva seated on the chariot before heading to war, chariot was unable to move forward, Lord Vishnu took form as bull and dragged the chariot and then became the bull flag on top of chariot. After destroying three cities Lord Shiva started tandava nritya on debris which is also called as "Tripura Nasha Nartana".

The Devas then understood:

1. Shiva can take the power of anyone/anything because it is his power that is already existing in first place. 

2. Even though the boon granted was "one-arrow-one-shot and cities should be destroyed", Shiva has the ultimate power to rule them over. 

3. Lord Shiva does not require a huge Chariot. He could simply destroy/create anything even without moving his eyes.

The "smile and burn" act of Shiva in Tamil is beautifully called as "punnagaithu purameritha peruman" ("சிரித்துப்புரமெரித்த பெருமான்")(The god who burned the Tripura with his laugh) 

Tripurantaka, is the manifestation of Shiva as the destroyer of the Tripuras. Tripurantaka idol is enshrined at Tiruvatikai near Chidambaram. The Veeratteswarar temple here is one of the 8 Veerata stalas celebrating Shiva as the destroyer of evil forces. Tripurantaka is also enshrined at Tiruvirkolam (Koovum) near Chennai.

Stella Kramrisch maintains of the Tripurantaka episode in her book 'The Presence of Shiva' that:

"The asuras had taken over the three cities of the gods and the allusion was also to the triple passions of Pride, Anger and Delusion in the site of the devotee. These cities of the demons needed to be destroyed by Shiva when they were felled by a single arrow. The Tripura myth also had a cosmo-symbolical dimension where Shiva regained for the gods a universe from which they were ousted. His mythical arrow was equivalent in efficacy with the rites performed by the gods with Agni as their agent. These cities were the work of the demon mastermind - Maya. It was a world conquest, a universal conflagration that wiped out the demons from the earth, air and sky." 

Metaphysically, the purpose of destruction of Tripura by Shiva is only for purification. He gave life to the three demon princes. Though they had adopted the wrong path, they were initially devotees of Shiva. They repented for their wrongdoings and Shiva forgave them and granted them the boon to one of them of the great service of fanning him with chamaram, and to the others, the service as Shivaganas in his abode.

Mayasura Protected 
Lord Shiva immediately regretted his act of releasing arrow, since he had forgotten to protect Maya, a great devotee of his. Realising this, Nandi raced ahead of the arrow and informed Maya of the impending doom. Instantly, Maya fled Tripura, leaving behind the great city he had constructed, which was immediately reduced to ashes, along with its inhabitants, the Asuras, by the great arrow of Shiva. This destruction of Tripura, led to the appellation Tripurantaka (त्रिपुरान्तक), for Shiva.

In Yajur Veda VI.2.3
"The Asuras had three citadels; the lowest was of iron, then there was one of silver, then one of gold. The gods could not conquer them; they sought to conquer them by siege; therefore they say--both those who know thus and those who do not--'By siege they conquer great citadels.' They made ready an arrow, Agni as the point, Soma as the socket, Visnu as the shaft. They said, 'Who shall shoot it?' 'Rudra', they said, 'Rudra is cruel, let him shoot it.' He said, 'Let me choose a boon; let me be overlord of animals.' Therefore is Rudra overlord of animals. Rudra let it go; it cleft the three citadels and drove the Asuras away from these worlds. The observance of the Upasads is for the driving away of foes. One should not offer another libation in front; if be were to offer another libation in front, he would make something else the beginning. He sprinkles clarified butter with the dipping-ladle to proclaim the sacrifice. He makes the offering after crossing over without coming back; verily he drives away his foes from these worlds so that they come not back. Then returning he offers the Upasad libation; verily having driven away his foes from these worlds and having conquered he mounts upon the world of his foes."

Iconography
Tripurantaka is usually potarted as an archer with four arms, his third (right arm) carrying the Trisula, while the fourth (left) holding the damru, in the other two he holds the Pinaka Bow releasing the Pashupatastra Arrow on Tripura.

Iconographical features of Tripurantaka Shiva (Shiva slaying the Demon Tripurasura). The earliest form of this can be seen in Patadakal (belonging to Badami Chalukya period, 6-7 AD). Rashtrakutas also followed the same features as can be seen in Ellora, Kailasanatha Temple. Tripuranthakeshwara  temple at Balligave is built by Kalyana Chalukyas.  During Hoysala period, this story was presented in more detail and with beautiful ornamentation as can be seen in Hoysala temples at Javagal and Hosa Holalu. During this period, representing Tripurasura in 3 circular patterns began. This style is carried on by Vijayanagara sculptures and painters. One can see this depiction in murals at Virupaksha temple at Hampi.

In other iconography, Tripurantaka is shown wearing a garland of skulls, holding destructive weapons which include: Trishula, Vajra, Noose and Sword.

In Hindu art, Tripurantaka is seen as a giant person of light showering light at the darkness which is known as "the destroyer of evil and darkness".

Festivals
Tripurantaka had various festivals, mainly he is celebrated on Kartik Purnima, which falls under the month of Kartik. He is also worshiped on Maha Shivaratri as an important manifestation of Shiva.

Devotees offer prasad which are Hindu sacred offerings to the deity, Tripurantaka prayers are usually done on the day of Rudra yagna which he  is seen as the protector of the universe.

See also

Tripura (mythology)
Tripurantaka Temple

Notes

References
Dictionary of Hindu Lore and Legend by Anna Dallapiccola
Encyclopedia of Hinduism - Volumes on Shiva Ed. by Dr. Nagendra Kr. Singh

Forms of Shiva